The Crawford DP03 is a first-generation Daytona Prototype sports racing car, designed, developed and built by American manufacturer Crawford Composites, in 2003.

References

2000s cars
Mid-engined cars
Rear-wheel-drive vehicles
Sports prototypes